Aquatics at the 1987 Southeast Asian Games included swimming, diving and water polo events. The three sports of aquatics were held at Senayan Swimming Stadium, Jakarta, Indonesia. Aquatics events was held between 10 September to 16 September.

Medal winners

Swimming
Men's events

Women's events

Diving

Water polo

Medal table

References
 https://eresources.nlb.gov.sg/newspapers/Digitised/Article/straitstimes19870911-1.2.56.38
 https://eresources.nlb.gov.sg/newspapers/Digitised/Article/straitstimes19870912-1.2.44.15.15
 https://eresources.nlb.gov.sg/newspapers/Digitised/Article/straitstimes19870913-1.2.43.4

1987
1987 Southeast Asian Games
1987 in water sports